Reidar Sundby (17 October 1926 – 27 October 2014) was a Norwegian footballer.

He started his career in Stag, and joined Larvik Turn in 1952. With his team he won the Norwegian Main League 1952-53, the Norwegian Main League 1954-55 and the Norwegian Main League 1955-56—and became top goalscorer in the Norwegian Main League 1958-59. He scored 71 goals in 110 first-tier games for Larvik Turn.

He was capped once for Norway, in 1954, and even scored in the game against Sweden. He later coached Stag.

He died in October 2014. He was the father of Tom Sundby.

References

External links
 

1926 births
2014 deaths
People from Larvik
Norwegian footballers
Larvik Turn players
Norway international footballers
Norwegian football managers
Association footballers not categorized by position
Sportspeople from Vestfold og Telemark